The Seychelles palm frog (Sechellophryne pipilodryas) is a species of frog that is endemic to Silhouette Island in the Seychelles. It is closely related to Gardiner's frog, Sechellophryne gardineri.

It is the most arboreal of the Sooglossidae. As a result, the palm frog is the most recent species of the family to have been discovered (in 2000).

The reproductive biology of this species is unknown, but it is presumed to involve direct development, i.e. eggs that hatch directly into froglets.

IUCN has reassessed the species in 2012 and concluded that Seychelles palm frog should be considered as "Critically Endangered" because of its small area of occupancy (about 7 km2), decline in population size, and threats to its habitat. Its earlier (2004) classification was only "Vulnerable".

References

External links 
Monitoring and research into the amphibians and reptiles of Seychelles
Image of the Seychelles palm frog

Amphibians of Seychelles
Endemic fauna of Seychelles
Sechellophryne
Amphibians described in 2002